My Run is a 2009 documentary film directed and produced by Tim VandeSteeg and produced by Mark Castaldo.  The film chronicles Terry Hitchcock's journey of completing 75 marathons in 75 consecutive days to raise awareness for single parent families. It first screened at the Austin Film Festival on October 23, 2009.

Plot
My Run tells the true story of two journeys. The first, which began in 1984, opens the film when Terry Hitchcock's wife Sue dies of breast cancer. Only a few days later he loses his job. Suddenly, he finds himself alone with his three young children and no income.

The film follows Terry as he learns to function as a single parent, and discovers how difficult it is to maintain and nourish a strong loving family and how faith can be instrumental in strengthening your will to keep moving forward. His experience also teaches him that single parents and their children are unsung everyday heroes.

The film jumps forward to 1996, when Terry takes the first step of his "Mega-Marathon" from Minneapolis to Atlanta. He runs every day, covering the equivalent of a marathon or more for 75 consecutive days to arrive just in time for the summer Olympic Games. He runs in honor of his wife and to bring attention and a voice to the everyday heroes; the single parents and their kids.

Terry expresses in the film that he wants to let everyone know that nothing is impossible, that ordinary people can do extraordinary things and by doing so inspire others. "Every one of us can do something", Terry says, "that's what it’s all about".

Production
Director/Producer Tim VandeSteeg was inspired to make this film after meeting Terry Hitchcock through a mutual contact.

Billy Bob Thornton's narration was recorded in the same studio where his group The Boxmasters records.

Critical reception 
Josh Board, from Sandiego.com says "Run, don't walk, to catch this in the theatres when its released."

Accolades

References

External links 
 
 
 

2009 films
American track and field films
American sports documentary films
2009 documentary films
2000s English-language films
2000s American films